Víctimas del Vaciamiento is the third and last album of Argentine heavy metal band Hermética, released in 1994 by Radio Trípoli Discos. It was the best selling album of the band.

Background
Hermética's first drummer, Tony Scotto, left the band in 1991 and was replaced by Claudio Strunz, right before they recorded Ácido Argentino. The album was a success, and the label allowed the band to record their new studio album in better conditions.

Production
Drummer Claudio Strunz had better recording conditions than in Ácido Argentino, as he had both more time to practice the songs and experience with the band. Unlike the previous album, the new one had more varied song structures, and a higher coordination with the guitar style of Antonio Romano.

Track listing
All lyrics written by Ricardo Iorio.

Personnel
Band

Claudio O'Connor - lead vocals.
Antonio Romano - guitar.
Ricardo Iorio - bass guitar, lead vocals on «Olvídalo y volverá por más» and «Del colimba», fragment on «Moraleja» and introduction on «Otro día para ser».
Claudio Strunz - drums.

Others
 Alvaro Villagra - Sound engineer, keyboards on «Otro día para ser» and «Cuando duerme la ciudad», piano on «Moraleja»
 Marcelo Tommy Moya - Management
 Marcelo Caputo - Management
 Sergio Fasanelli - Executive producer

References

Information about the disc at rock.com.ar
Hermética's biography at rock.com.ar

1994 albums
Hermética albums